Senjski Rudnik is a village located in the municipality of Despotovac, eastern Serbia. According to the 2011 census, it had a population of 438 inhabitants. It is the site of the oldest preserved coal mine in Serbia, established in 1853. The mine marks the beginnings of the industrial revolution in Serbia.

History 

The coal mine was opened on 11 July 1853 and was operational for almost 120 years. On 13 July 1903, the first mining trade union organization in Serbia was founded in Senjski Rudnik, and already on 6 August they organized the general strike which ended after 9 days with the management accepting to raise wages and to improve working conditions. In 1955, the 6 August was declared a national miners' day.

In 1923, the football club "Rudar" was founded. The cultural center Sokol House was established, which also operated as a cinema from 1934. After World War II, composer , future founder of the popular music in Yugoslavia, was sent to the center to organize the cultural and artistic life in the small town, which together with the neighboring Senje, after which it was named, had some 3,000 inhabitants. Kraljić's piano is exhibited in the local museum.

The village had an elementary school. Young engineers were having their practical education in the settlement and participated in economic life, so it was recorded that between 1955 and 1968, the only two major industrial branches which were not represented in Senjski Rudnik were aircraft industry and shipbuilding. There was a large hospital in the settlement, one of the best equipped in the state. Famous military surgeon Izidor Papo performed surgeries in it. However, the mine was soon closed.

In 1980, film Petria's Wreath, directed by Srđan Karanović and starring Mirjana Karanović, was filmed in Senjski Rudnik. The house where it was filmed is today known as the Petrija's House.

Coal mining museum 

As of 2010, there is an ongoing project, sponsored by the Council of Europe and the Ministry of Culture of Serbia, of restoration of preservation of the mine complex, which will turn the entire site into an open-air museum and historical heritage site.

By February 2018, the display included 1,000 exhibits and 5,000 photos and is organized as the Coal Mining Museum. The industrial heritage complex includes:

 Main building; built in 1930, today it hosts the central exhibition which on two levels presents mining history in the region, from the 3rd century until today;
 Engineering workshop; it consists of four rooms, displaying the everyday life of the miners and their families; documents show that women worked as miners even decades before World War I, but especially during the war when men were drafted;
 Open-air exhibition; hosts exhibits too large for the indoors display: machines, apparatuses, cars, etc.
 Mining elevator; the only one of its kind remaining in the world, so it was placed under the state protection; it is still operational; the hoist was constructed in 1872 in Graz, Austria, has hornbeam gear wheels and is steam operated;
 "Aleksandar's underground mine"; entry into the mineshaft and the administrative building above the entry, built in 1860 and completely preserved;
 "Sokol house"; the first Worker's council in Serbia was formed in it;
 Church of the Saint Procopius; built in 1900 in memory of the dead miners from the 1893 fire;
 Radnička and Činovnička streets;
 House of Petrija;
 Elementary school "Dositej Obradović"; built in 1896;
 Lebanese cedar park; named after the Lebanese cedar tree brought from the Mount Athos in 1903;

Future additions include the underground museum and restoration of the miners' restaurant which will be used by the tourists. Project is based on the similar facilities in Velenje, Slovenia and Bochum, Germany. The exhibition will be interactive and the visitors would leave the shaft via original mining elevator.

In the close vicinity of the museum are the monasteries of Ravanica and Manasija, the Resava Cave and the Lisine waterfall.

Notable people 

 Nebojša Pavković, former Chief of the General Staff of Armed Forces of FR Yugoslavia

References

External links

 Unofficial website 

Populated places in Pomoravlje District
Coal mines in Serbia